Breton saints refers to one of two groups, the innumerable people who lived, died, worked in, or came to be particularly venerated in the nine traditional dioceses of Brittany (Cornouaille, Dol, Léon, Nantes, Rennes, Saint-Brieuc, Saint-Malo, Tréguier, Vannes) who were accepted as saintly before the establishment of the Congregation of Rites (now the Congregation for the Causes of Saints), or those saints, blesseds, venerables, and Servants of God who have come to be recognized since that time.

Armorican saints
Before the Bretons came, the land now known as Brittany was known as Armorica within the Roman province of Gallia Lugdunensis. The earliest saint associated with this region is Anne, mother of Mary (mother of Jesus), said by tradition to have been Armorican, and she is the patroness of Brittany. She also appeared to Yves Nicolazic, to whom she spoke in Breton.

After her, the earliest saints in what is now Brittany have dates which are sometimes unclear, but tradition holds they go back to the earliest days of the church. Maxime, said to have been the disciple of Philip the Apostle, was sent to preach among the Gauls and was made the first Bishop of Rennes. He may have been accompanied by saints by the names of Clarus and Justus.  Pope Linus, the second Bishop of Rome, sent Clair and Adeodatus; this is said to be Clair who became the first Bishop of Nantes around AD 280 and died early in the third century, though the dates make this suspect, and Adeodatus preached especially in the area of Vannes.  Other Armorican saints include Similien, the third Bishop of Nantes in the early fourth century, and the brother-martyrs Donatian and Rogatian.  Palladius may also have had an Armorican connection.

The Seven Founders

The Bretons, coming from the British Isles, brought Christianity with them.  With the coming of the Bretons, the seven ancient dioceses were established by the seven founding saints.

 Tudwal founded Tréguier
 Pol Aurelian founded Saint-Pol-de-Leon
 Brioc founded Saint-Brieuc
 Malo founded Saint-Malo
 Patern founded Vannes
 Corentin founded Cornouailles
 Samson founded Dol

The other two dioceses of Brittany were founded by Clair de Nantes and Maxime de Rennes.

Medieval saints

Monarchs

 Darerca, Queen of Brittany
 Judicael, Breton king
 Salomon, King of Brittany

Bishops

Others

Modern saints

The "modern" in modern saints refers to the process, not the person, and groups those whose status has been recognized by Rome.

Saints

 Benedetto Menni, priest, canonized in 1999
 Gohard of Nantes, Bishop, canonized in 1096
 Louis de Montfort, priest, canonized in 1947
 Marie of the Cross (Jeanne Jugan), religious, canonized in 2009
 Mother Theodore, religious, canonized in 2006
 Vincent Ferrer, Dominican priest, canonized in 1455
 William Pinchon, Bishop, canonized in 1247
 Yves Helory, priest, canonized in 1347
 Of the One Hundred Twenty Martyrs of China
 Marie of Saint Natalie (Jeanne-Marie Guerguin)
 Marie of Saint Just (Anne-Françoise Moreau)

Blesseds (by beatification)

 Cassien of Nantes, Capuchin, beatified in 1905
 Charles of Blois, duke, beatified in 1904
 Julian Maunoir, Jesuit priest, beatified in 1951
 Marcel Callo, layman, beatified in 1987
 Mary of the Passion, religious, beatified in 2002
 Marie-Louise-Élisabeth de Lamoignon, religious, beatified in 2012
 Pierre-Rene Rouge, Vincentian priest, beatified in 1934
 Of the Twenty Martyrs of Capuchin Tertiary Fathers and Brothers of Our Lady of Sorrows in Spain, beatified in 2001
 Carmen Marie Anne Garcia Moyon
 Of the Fifteen Martyrs of the Daughters of Charity of Saint Vincent de Paul and the Ursulines of Valenciennes (of the Martyrs of the French Revolution, beatified in 1920
 Therese-Madeleine Fantou
 Of the One Hundred Ninety-One Martyrs of the September Massacres, beatified in 1926
 Charles-Francois le Gue
 Claude-Antoine-Raoul Laporte
 Francois-Hyacinth le Livec de Tresurin
 Henri-August Luzeau de la Mulonniere
 Jean-Charles-Marie Bernard du Cornillet
 Joseph Becavin
 Louis-Laurent Gaultier
 Mathurin-Nicolas de la Villecrohain le Bous de Villeneuve
 Nicolas-Marie Verron
 Rene-Joseph Urvoy
 Rene-Julien Massey
 Rene-Marie Andrieux
 Vincent-Joseph le Rousseau de Rosencoat
 Yves-Andre Guillon de Keranrun
 Yves-Jean-Pierre Rey de Kervisic
 Of the Fifteen Martyrs of Laos
 Jean-Baptiste Malo
 Joseph Boissel
 Vincent L'Henoret
 Of the Nineteen Martyrs of Algeria
 Alain Dieulangard
 Celestin Ringeard
 Michel Fleury

Blesseds (by confirmation of cult)

 David, cult confirmed in 1120
 Françoise d'Amboise, cult confirmed 1863
 John of the Grating, Cistercian Bishop, cult confirmed in 1517
 Yann Divotou, Franciscan priest, cult confirmed in 1989
 Ralph de la Futaye, unclear when cult confirmed

Venerables

 Alain-Marie Guynot de Boismenu, religious Bishop, proclaimed in 2014
 Jean-Marie Robert de la Mennais, religious priest, proclaimed in 1966
 Marie-Amelie Fristel, religious, proclaimed in 1976
 Michel le Nobletz, priest, proclaimed in 1915

Servants of God

 Louis-Marie Leveil
 Louis de Goesbriand
 Alano Maria du Noday
 Catherine de Francheville
 Claude-Francois Poullart des Places
 Francois-Marie-Benjamin Richard de la Vergne
 Jacques Cathelineau
 Jean of Saint Samson
 Marie-Yvonne-Aimee of Jesus
 Pauline-Louise Pinczon du Sel
 Pierre Quintin
 Pierre-Joseph Picot de Cloriviere
 Robert of Arbrissel
 Simon Brute
 Victor Lelievre
 Yves Nicolazic (Ivon Nikolazig in Breton)
 Of the Fifty Martyrs of France of the Apostolate Within the Service du Travail Obligatoire
 Eugene Lemoine
 Maurice-Philippe Bouchard
 Roger (Paul) le Ber
 Of the Thirty-Eight Martyrs of the Revolutionary Tribunal of Paris
 Francois-Georges Cormaux
 Therese Guillaudeu du Plessis
 Victoire Conen de Saint-Luc
 The Eighty-Five Martyrs of Rennes of the French Revolution

Other saintly Bretons

 Corentin Cloarec, killed by the Nazis
 Joachim Nio, killed by the Gestapo

See also
 List of Welsh saints, many of whom shared Breton connections.
 List of saints of the Canary Islands

References
 "The Catholic Encyclopedia"
 "Hagiography Circle"
 M. de Garaby, Vie des bienheureux et des saints de Bretagne, éd. J.-M. Williamson, Nantes, 1839. Réédition 1991.
 P.T. de S. Luc, C.  L'Histoire de Conan Mériadec Qui Fait le Premier regne de l'histoire generale des souverains de la Bretagne Gauloise, dite Armorique. Paris, 1664.

Breton
 
Saints
Saints